Barry Halliwell (born 18 October 1949) is an English biochemist, chemist and university administrator, specialising in free radical metabolism in both animals and plants. His name is included in the "Foyer–Halliwell–Asada" pathway, a cellular process of hydrogen peroxide metabolism in plants and animals, named for the three principal discoverers, with Christine Foyer and Kozi Asada. He moved to Singapore in 2000, and served as Deputy President (Research and Technology) of the National University of Singapore (2006–15), where (as of 2018) he continues to hold a Tan Chin Tuan Centennial professorship.

Early life and education
Born in Preston, Lancashire in 1949, Halliwell was educated at Preston Grammar School. He attended St Catherine's College, University of Oxford (1968–71), achieving a BA with First Class (honours) in biochemistry. He was also awarded the Rose Prize for the best final papers of any candidate in biological sciences. His D.Phil in plant biochemistry was also at Oxford, supervised by Frederick R. Whatley and Vernon Butt; his thesis was entitled "The biochemistry of plant peroxisomes" (1973). He was later awarded a D.Sc from the University of London for his work on the biochemistry of free radical reactions in plant and animal systems.

Career and writing
After leaving Oxford, Halliwell briefly lectured at the Portsmouth Polytechnic (1973–74). He took up a position as lecturer at King's College London in 1974, remaining there until 2000, rising to the position of professor of medical biochemistry in the Division of Pharmacology. He also simultaneously held a visiting professorship at the University of California, Davis, United States (1995–99). After a 1998 sabbatical at the National University of Singapore (NUS), he moved there in 2000 as chair of the biochemistry department. As of 2018 he is a professor in the department of biochemistry at the NUS Yong Loo Lin School of Medicine, where he holds a Tan Chin Tuan Centennial professorship.

Halliwell served as the NUS's first Deputy President (Research and Technology) in 2006–15, founding the Graduate School for Integrative Sciences and Engineering, and overseeing a doubling in the university's research grants. He was subsequently appointed Senior Advisor to the NUS President. He chairs Singapore's Biomedical Research Council.

His textbook, Free Radicals in Biology and Medicine, co-written with John M. C. Gutteridge, is considered "an authoritative text in the field". His work is highly cited; in 2011, eight of his research articles had each received over a thousand citations.

Research
Halliwell is known for his work on the control of free radicals in biological systems. His earliest research was in plants, where with Christine Foyer and others in 1976, he discovered the glutathione–ascorbate cycle (also known as the Foyer–Halliwell–Asada pathway) by which chloroplasts remove damaging hydrogen peroxide. He subsequently focused on the role of free radicals in human diseases, demonstrating the toxicity of the hydroxyl radical, a metabolite of superoxide, and investigated the involvement of metal ions, including iron and zinc, in this process, as well as the protective effect of their sequestration. He has also worked on reactive nitrogen species. He developed methods to measure free radical levels in vivo and to quantify the damage they cause to DNA. He has also researched dietary antioxidants.

As of 2018, his research focuses on the role of free radicals and antioxidants in human disease, particularly Alzheimer's disease and other brain disorders. His interests include the characterisation of redox biomarkers for the identification of human diseases, molecular nutrition, the role of transition metal ions as promoters of radical reactions in vitro and in vivo, the development of drugs to prevent oxidative cell damage, the chemical nature of antioxidants in vivo, methods for the specific detection of reactive oxygen and reactive nitrogen species in vivo and their application to human disease, particularly stroke and neuro-degenerative diseases and ageing in humans and in the nematode Caenorhabditis elegans.

Awards and honours
Halliwell was elected a fellow of the American Association for the Advancement of Science in 2012. He was dubbed a "Research Pioneer" by the journal Antioxidants & Redox Signaling in 2011. Other awards include a lifetime achievement award from the American Society for Free Radical Biology and Medicine (2008) and the Ken Bowman Research Award from the Canadian Institute of Cardiovascular Sciences (2011).

Selected publications
Books
Barry Halliwell, John MC Gutteridge. Free Radicals in Biology and Medicine (5th edn) (Oxford University Press, 2015) 
Barry Halliwell. Chloroplast Metabolism (2nd edn) (Oxford University Press, 1984) 
Reviews

Research articles

References 

1949 births
Living people
Scientists from Preston, Lancashire
Alumni of St Catherine's College, Oxford
Alumni of the University of London
Academics of King's College London
Academic staff of the National University of Singapore
English biochemists
Fellows of the American Association for the Advancement of Science